Baltakis is a Lithuanian surname originated from the Lithuanian nickname "Baltakis" literally meaning "white-eyed". Notable people with the surname include:

 (1930–2022), Lithuanian poet, literary critic, editor, translator
 (born 1957), Lithuanian badminton player
Paulius Antanas Baltakis (1925–2019), Lithuanian Roman Catholic prelate

See also

References

Lithuanian-language surnames